James Cash may refer to:

 James Cash Jr. (born 1947), American businessman
 Jim Cash (1941–2000), American film writer

See also